, also known as MTV, is a television network headquartered in Tsu, Mie Prefecture, Japan.  It is a member of the Japanese Association of Independent Television Stations (JAITS),  also the only commerical television in Mie Prefecture.  Nagoya Dome is the main shareholder of Mie TV. 

Mie TV was founded in 1968, commenced television broadcast in December 1969.  Mie TV started digital terrestrial television broadcasting in 2005.  In some part of Aichi prefecture, people also can watch Mie TV's program.

References

External links
 Official website 

Independent television stations in Japan
Television channels and stations established in 1968
Japanese companies established in 1968